István Zsolt (28 June 1921, Budapest – 7 May 1991) was a Hungarian international football referee. He officiated at the 1954, 1958 and 1966 World Cup tournaments and the Olympic Games of 1952, 1960, 1964 and 1968.

See also
:hu:Zsolt István

References

WorldReferee.com – referee – Istvan Zsolt – bio
István Zsolt :: footballzz.co.uk
István Zsolt : scoreshelf.com
Istvan Zsolt – Appearances as referee
Istvan Zsolt – Appearances as assistant

1921 births
1991 deaths
Hungarian football referees
FIFA World Cup Final match officials
1954 FIFA World Cup referees
1958 FIFA World Cup referees
1966 FIFA World Cup referees
Olympic football referees
UEFA Euro 1968 referees